Jiří Vaněk was a Czech rower. He competed in the men's coxless four event at the 1948 Summer Olympics.

References

External links
 

Year of birth missing
Possibly living people
Czech male rowers
Olympic rowers of Czechoslovakia
Rowers at the 1948 Summer Olympics
Place of birth missing